2007 in sports describes the year's events in world sport.

Alpine skiing
 Alpine Skiing World Cup
 Men's overall season champion: Aksel Lund Svindal (Norway)
 Women's overall season champion: Nicole Hosp (Austria)

American football
 Super Bowl XLI – the Indianapolis Colts (AFC) won 29–17 over the Chicago Bears (NFC)
Location: Dolphin Stadium
Attendance: 74,512
MVP: Peyton Manning, QB (Indianapolis)
 BCS National Championship Game at Fiesta Bowl (2006 season):
 The Florida Gators won 41–14 over the Ohio State Buckeyes to win the National Championship
 December 16 - The Miami Dolphins defeat the Baltimore Ravens 22–16 in overtime to claim their only win of the 2007 NFL season. With the Dolphins losing their final two games, they would've suffered an Imperfect season if not for that overtime victory, a year before the Detroit Lions became the first winless team since the NFL expanded to a 16-game schedule.
 December 29 - The New England Patriots became the second team after the 1972 Miami Dolphins to win all their regular season games after defeating the New York Giants 38-35 (16-0). They would win 2 playoff games and enter Super Bowl XLII at 18–0. However, the Patriots could not complete what could have been a historic 19–0 season. The Giants upset the Patriots 17–14.

Association football

 UEFA Champions League 2006-07 Final in Athens won by AC Milan over Liverpool 2–1
 UEFA Cup 2006-07 Final in Glasgow – Sevilla beat Espanyol 2–2 (3–1 pens)
 Copa América 2007 in Venezuela – Brazil beat Argentina 3–0 in the final
 Copa Libertadores 2007 won by Boca Juniors.

Australian rules football
 Geelong wins its first Australian Football League Grand Final since 1963, thrashing Port Adelaide by 119 points in the biggest Grand Final margin in VFL/AFL history. The final score was 24.19 (163) to 6.8 (44).

Athletics

 August–September – 2007 World Championships in Athletics held at Nagai Stadium in Osaka
 September 9 – sprinter Asafa Powell of Jamaica breaks the previous record set by himself at the 100 metres sprint (9.77 seconds) and sets a new world record of 9.74
 September 30 – Haile Gebrselassie of Ethiopia sets new world marathon record time of 2:04:26 at Berlin

Baseball

 2007 World Series – Boston Red Sox sweep the Colorado Rockies 4–0
 2007 Japan Series – in a rematch of last year's series, the Chunichi Dragons win 4–1 over the 2006 champion Hokkaido Nippon-Ham Fighters.
 August 7 – Barry Bonds became Major League Baseball's career leader in home runs amid a cloud of controversy regarding his suspected use of performance-enhancing drugs by hitting the 756th home run of his career, surpassing Hank Aaron's previous mark of 755
 2007 Asia Series – Japanese team Chunichi Dragons wins against Koreans SK Wyverns
Oregon State Beavers win back to back National Championships.
2007 Pacific Asian Baseball League Finals -
Seoul Shrubbery defeat the defend champions Singapore Sushi 1,300-1,212 to capture their first ever Periwinkle Feather.

Basketball

 January 1: Bob Knight becomes the winningest coach in men's college basketball history when Texas Tech defeats New Mexico, 70–68.
 San Antonio Spurs won their fourth NBA Championship by sweeping the Cleveland Cavaliers in four games.  Tony Parker was named Finals MVP.
 2007 NCAA Division I men's basketball tournament – Florida became the first team to repeat as champions since Duke in 1991 and 1992
 2007 NCAA Division I women's basketball tournament won for the seventh time by Tennessee with the Lady Vols' Candace Parker named Most Outstanding Player.
 Euroleague Final – Panathinaikos defeat defending champions CSKA Moscow 93–91 at the Olympic Indoor Hall in Athens
 The Phoenix Mercury would stun the 2006 WNBA Champion Detroit Shock in 5 games to capture their first title in franchise history. It was the second year in a row that a defending champion was stunned by another team who wasn't in the finals that previous year.

Boxing
 January 20 Nicolay Valuev successfully defends his WBA Heavyweight title by defeating Jameel McCline, by technical knockout aun McCline blows out his knee.
 February 3  Chad Dawson becomes the WBC Light Heavyweight champion after defeating Tomasz Adamek by unanimous decision.  Despite being knocked down from a straight right hand on round ten, Dawson dominates most of the fight with his speed.
 February 10 Shane Mosley becomes the WBC Welterweight champion by defeating Luis Collazo by unanimous decision.
 March 10 Wladimir Klitschko successfully defends his IBF Heavyweight title after defeating Ray Austin by 2nd-round knockout.
 April 14 Ruslan Chagaev becomes the new WBA Heavyweight Champion after defeating Nicolay Valuev by majority decision.
 April 28 Juan Díaz unifies the WBA and WBO Lightweight titles after defeating Acelino Freitas, after Freitas refused to answer the bell before round nine.
 June 2 Sultan Ibragimov defeats Shannon Briggs by unanimous decision to take the WBO Heavyweight title.
 September 29 Kelly Pavlik upsets Jermain Taylor by seventh-round TKO to win the WBC, WBO, and universally recognized Middleweight Champion of the World. Pavlik was knocked down in the second round, but rallied back against a tired Taylor.
 November 4 Joe Calzaghe defeats Mikkel Kessler by unanimous decision in a unification bout for the WBA, WBC and WBO super middleweight titles. Calzaghe becomes the first undisputed super middleweight champion and surpasses the 20 defences made by Bernard Hopkins and Larry Holmes at middleweight and heavyweight respectively.

Canadian football
 November 25 – The Saskatchewan Roughriders win the 95th Grey Cup game, defeating the Winnipeg Blue Bombers 23–19 at Rogers Centre in Toronto.

Cricket
 The Ashes – Australia completes a 5–0 whitewash over England in the 2006-07 Ashes series, the first time since 1920–21 that one team has won all the Tests in an Ashes series
 2007 Cricket World Cup held in the West Indies – Australia beat Sri Lanka by 53 runs in the final
 The inaugural ICC World Twenty20 held in South Africa; India beat Pakistan in the finals by 5 runs

Cross-country skiing

Cycling
Grand Tours:
Alberto Contador wins the 2007 Tour de France.
Danilo Di Luca wins the 2007 Giro d'Italia.
Denis Menchov wins the 2007 Vuelta a España.

Darts
 2007 PDC World Darts Championship Final – Raymond van Barneveld beats Phil Taylor 7–6

Field hockey
 2007 Men's Hockey Champions Trophy: Germany
 2007 Men's Hockey Champions Challenge: Argentina
 2007 Men's EuroHockey Nations Championship: Netherlands
 2007 Women's Hockey Champions Trophy: Netherlands
 2007 Women's Hockey Champions Challenge: China
 2007 Women's EuroHockey Nations Championship: Germany

Floorball
 Women's World Floorball Championships
 Champion: 
 Men's under-19 World Floorball Championships
 Champion: 
 European Cup
 Men's champion:  AIK IBF
 Women's champion:  UHC Dietlikon

Golf
Men's professional
 Masters Tournament – Zach Johnson
 U.S. Open at Oakmont – Ángel Cabrera
 British Open at Carnoustie – Pádraig Harrington beats Sergio García in a play-off.
 PGA Championship at Southern Hills – Tiger Woods wins his thirteenth major championship, and fourth PGA Championship.
Men's amateur
 British Amateur – Drew Weaver
 U.S. Amateur – Colt Knost
 European Amateur – Benjamin Hébert
Women's professional
 Kraft Nabisco Championship at Mission Hills Country Club (Rancho Mirage, California) – Morgan Pressel, at 18 years 313 days, becomes the youngest woman to ever win a major. She is also the first American to win this particular event since Dottie Pepper in 1999.
 LPGA Championship at Bulle Rock Golf Course (Havre de Grace, Maryland) – Norway's Suzann Pettersen wins her first major.
 US Women's Open at Pine Needles Lodge & Golf Club (Southern Pines, North Carolina) – American Cristie Kerr wins her first major.
 Women's British Open at St Andrews – World Number 1 Lorena Ochoa of Mexico wins her first major.

Handball
 2007 World Men's Handball Championship – won by Germany

Horse racing
Steeplechases
 Cheltenham Gold Cup – Kauto Star
 Grand National – Silver Birch
Flat races
 Australia – Melbourne Cup won by Efficient
 Canadian Triple Crown:
 Queen's Plate – Mike Fox
 Prince of Wales Stakes – Alezzandro
 Breeders' Stakes – Marchfield
 Dubai – Dubai World Cup won by Invasor
 France – Prix de l'Arc de Triomphe won by Dylan Thomas
 Ireland – Irish Derby Stakes won by Soldier of Fortune
 Japan – Japan Cup won by Admire Moon
 English Triple Crown:
 2,000 Guineas Stakes – Cockney Rebel
 The Derby – Authorized
 St. Leger Stakes – Lucarno
 United States Triple Crown Races:
 Kentucky Derby – Street Sense
 Preakness Stakes – Curlin
 Belmont Stakes – Rags to Riches
 Breeders' Cup World Thoroughbred Championships:
 Day 1:
 Breeders' Cup Filly & Mare Sprint – Maryfield
 Breeders' Cup Juvenile Turf – Nownownow
 Breeders' Cup Dirt Mile – Corinthian
 Day 2:
 Breeders' Cup Juvenile Fillies – Indian Blessing
 Breeders' Cup Juvenile – War Pass
 Breeders' Cup Filly & Mare Turf – Lahudood
 Breeders' Cup Sprint – Midnight Lute
 Breeders' Cup Mile – Kip Deville
 Breeders' Cup Distaff – Ginger Punch
 Breeders' Cup Turf – English Channel
 Breeders' Cup Classic – Curlin

Ice hockey
 May 8 – The International Ice Hockey Federation announces that it will formalize the Triple Gold Club, previously a media-created term that grouped individuals who have won the Stanley Cup along with gold medals at the Olympics and World Championships. At the time of announcement, the club consisted of 18 members.
 Anaheim Ducks win the Stanley Cup, defeating the Ottawa Senators in 5 games.
 The Ducks' Scott Niedermayer wins the Conn Smythe Trophy as MVP of the Stanley Cup playoffs.
 Fellow Duck Chris Pronger becomes the newest member of the Triple Gold Club.
 Dany Heatley scores 50 goals with the Ottawa Senators which leads to the creation of the phrase “50 in ‘07.”

Mixed martial arts
The following is a list of major noteworthy MMA events during 2007 in chronological order.

|-
|align=center style="border-style: none none solid solid; background: #e3e3e3"|Date
|align=center style="border-style: none none solid solid; background: #e3e3e3"|Event
|align=center style="border-style: none none solid solid; background: #e3e3e3"|Alternate Name/s
|align=center style="border-style: none none solid solid; background: #e3e3e3"|Location
|align=center style="border-style: none none solid solid; background: #e3e3e3"|Attendance
|align=center style="border-style: none none solid solid; background: #e3e3e3"|PPV Buyrate
|align=center style="border-style: none none solid solid; background: #e3e3e3"|Notes
|-align=center
|January 19
|IFL: Oakland
|
| Oakland, California, USA
|
|
|
|-align=center
|January 20
|WEC 25: McCullough vs. Cope
|
| Oakland, California, USA
|
|
|
|-align=center
|January 25
|UFC Fight Night: Rashad Evans vs Sean Salmon
|UFC Fight Night: Evans vs Salmon
UFC Fight Night 8
| Hollywood, Florida, USA
|
|
|
|-align=center
|February 2
|IFL: Houston
|
| Houston, Texas, USA
|
|
|
|-align=center
|February 3
|UFC 67: All or Nothing
|
| Las Vegas, Nevada, USA
|10,227
|350,000 (Min.)
400,000 (Max.)
|
|-align=center
|February 10
|Strikeforce: Young Guns
|
| San Jose, California, USA
|3,169
|
|
|-align=center
|February 10
|EliteXC Destiny
|
| Southaven, Mississippi, USA
|7,200
|
|
|-align=center
|February 10
|Cage Rage 20: Born 2 Fight
|
| London, England
|
|
|
|-align=center
|February 23
|IFL: Atlanta
|
| Duluth, Georgia, USA
|
|
|
|-align=center
|February 24
|Pride 33: The Second Coming
|
| Las Vegas, Nevada, USA
|12,911
|
|
|-align=center
|March 3
|UFC 68: The Uprising
|
| Columbus, Ohio, USA
|19,049
|534,000
|
|-align=center
|March 12
|K-1 Hero's 8
|
| Nagoya, Japan
|
|
|
|-align=center
|March 12
|IFL: Los Angeles
|
| Inglewood, California, USA
|
|
|
|-align=center
|March 24
|WEC 26: Condit vs. Alessio
|
| Las Vegas, Nevada, USA
|1,819
|
|
|-align=center
|April 5
|UFC Fight Night: Stevenson vs Guillard
|UFC Fight Night 9
| Las Vegas, Nevada, USA
|1,734
|
|
|-align=center
|April 7
|IFL: Moline
|
| Moline, Illinois, USA
|
|
|
|-align=center
|April 7
|UFC 69: Shootout
|
| Houston, Texas, USA
|15,269
|400,000
|
|-align=center
|April 8
|Pride 34: Kamikaze
|
| Saitama, Japan
|
|
|
|-align=center
|April 13
|IFL: Connecticut
|
| Uncasville, Connecticut, USA
|
|
|
|-align=center
|April 21
|UFC 70: Nations Collide
|
| Manchester, England
|15,114
|
|
|-align=center
|April 21
|Cage Rage 21: Judgement Day
|
| London, England
|
|
|
|-align=center
|May 12
|WEC 27: Marshall vs. McElfresh
|
| Las Vegas, Nevada, USA
|
|
|
|-align=center
|May 19
|IFL: Chicago
|
| Hoffman Estates, Illinois, USA
|
|
|
|-align=center
|May 26
|UFC 71: Liddell vs. Jackson
|
| Las Vegas, Nevada, USA
|14,728
|675,000
|
|-align=center
|June 1
|IFL: Everett
|
| Everett, Washington, USA
|
|
|
|-align=center
|June 2
|SoftBank presents Dynamite!! USA
|Dynamite!! USA
| Los Angeles, California, USA
|18,340
|35,000
|
|-align=center
|June 3
|WEC 28: Faber vs. Farrar
|
| Las Vegas, Nevada, USA
|
|
|
|-align=center
|June 12
|UFC Fight Night: Stout vs Fisher
|UFC Fight Night 10
| Hollywood, Florida, USA
|
|
|
|-align=center
|June 16
|IFL: Las Vegas
|
| Hollywood, Florida, USA
|
|
|
|-align=center
|June 16
|UFC 72: Victory
|
| Belfast, Northern Ireland, UK
|7,850
|200,000
|
|-align=center
|June 22
|Strikeforce: Shamrock vs. Baroni
|
| San Jose, California, USA
|9,672
|35,000
|
|-align=center
|June 23
|The Ultimate Fighter 5 Finale
|
| Las Vegas, Nevada, USA
|
|
|
|-align=center
|June 23
|CFFC V: Two Worlds, One Cage
|
| Atlantic City, New Jersey, USA
|7,286
|
|
|-align=center
|June 7
|UFC 73: Stacked
|
| Sacramento, California, USA
|13,183
|425,000
|
|-align=center
|June 16
|K-1 Hero's 9
|
| Yokohama, Japan
|
|
|
|-align=center
|June 27
|ShoXC 1
|
| Santa Ynez, California, USA
|
|
|
|-align=center
|August 2
|IFL: 2007 Semifinals
|
| East Rutherford, New Jersey, USA
|
|
|
|-align=center
|August 5
|WEC 29: Condit vs. Larson
|
| Las Vegas, Nevada, USA
|
|
|
|-align=center
|August 25
|ShoXC 2
|
| Vicksburg, Mississippi, USA
|
|
|
|-align=center
|August 25
|UFC 74: Respect
|
| Las Vegas, Nevada, USA
|11,118
|520,000
|
|-align=center
|September 1
|Art of War 3: USA vs Brazil
|
| Dallas, Texas, USA
|
|
|
|-align=center
|September 5
|WEC 30: McCullough vs. Crunkilton
|
| Las Vegas, Nevada, USA
|
|
|
|-align=center
|September 8
|UFC 75: Champion vs. Champion
|
| London, England
|16,235
|
|
|-align=center
|September 15
|EliteXC: Uprising
|
| Oahu, Hawaii, USA
|
|
|
|-align=center
|September 17
|K-1 Hero's 10
|
| Yokohama, Japan
|
|
|
|-align=center
|September 19
|UFC Fight Night: Din Thomas vs Kenny Florian
|UFC Fight Night: Thomas vs Florian
UFC Fight Night 11
| Las Vegas, Nevada, USA
|
|
|
|-align=center
|September 20
|IFL: 2007 Championship
|
| Hollywood, Florida, USA
|
|
|
|-align=center
|September 22
|UFC 76: Knockout
|
| Anaheim, California, USA
|13,770
|475,000
|
|-align=center
|September 22
|Cage Rage 23: Unbelievable
|
| London, England
|
|
|
|-align=center
|September 29
|Strikeforce: Playboy Mansion
|
| Los Angeles, California, USA
|3,569
|
|
|-align=center
|October 20
|UFC 77: Hostile Territory
|
| Cincinnati, Ohio, USA
|16,054
|325,000
|
|-align=center
|October 26
|ShoXC 3
|
| Santa Ynez, California, USA
|
|
|
|-align=center
|October 28
|K-1 Hero's Korea 2007
|
| Seoul, South Korea
|
|
|
|-align=center
|November 10
|EliteXC: Renegade
|
| Corpus Christi, Texas, USA
|
|
|
|-align=center
|November 16
|Strikeforce: Four Men Enter, One Man Survives
|
| San Jose, California, USA
|7,249
|
|
|-align=center
|November 17
|UFC 78: Validation
|
| Newark, New Jersey, USA
|14,071
|400,000
|
|-align=center
|December 1
|Cage Rage 24: Feel the Pain
|
| London, England
|
|
|
|-align=center
|December 8
|The Ultimate Fighter: Team Hughes vs Team Serra Finale
|The Ultimate Fighter 6 Finale
| Las Vegas, Nevada, USA
|
|
|
|-align=center
|December 12
|WEC 31: Faber vs. Curran
|
| Las Vegas, Nevada, USA
|
|
|
|-align=center
|December 29
|UFC 79: Nemesis
|
| Las Vegas, Nevada, USA
|11,075
|750,000+
|
|-align=center
|December 31
|K-1 PREMIUM 2007 Dynamite!!
|
| Osaka, Japan
|47,928
|
|
|-align=center
|December 31
|Yarennoka!
|
| Saitama, Japan
|27,128
|
|
|-align=center

Motorsport

Orienteering
 August – 2007 World Orienteering Championships held in Kiev

Rink hockey
 Spain wins the 2007 Rink Hockey World Championship, defeating Switzerland in the final.

Rugby league

 February 23 at Reebok Stadium, Bolton, England – 2007 World Club Challenge is won by St. Helens who defeated the Brisbane Broncos 18–14 before 23,207
 April 20 at Brisbane – 2007 ANZAC Day Test is won by Australia 30–6 against New Zealand at Suncorp Stadium before 35,241
 June 13 at Telstra Stadium, Sydney – The 2007 State of Origin series is wrapped up by Queensland in game two of the series before 76,924
 August 25 at Wembley Stadium – 2007 Challenge Cup tournament culminates in St. Helens' 30–8 win against Catalans Dragons in the final before 84,241
 September 30 at Sydney – The 2007 NRL season culminates in the minor premiers Melbourne Storm's 34–8 win against the Manly Warringah Sea Eagles in the 2007 NRL Grand Final
 October 13 at Manchester – Super League XII culminates in the Leeds Rhinos' 33–5 win against minor premiers St. Helens in the Grand Final
 November 17 at Paris – 2007 All Golds Tour, a repeat of the first ever international rugby league tour 100 years before, ends with a New Zealand win against France.

Rugby union

 113th Six Nations Championship series is won by France
 2007 Rugby World Cup held in stadiums throughout France, with matches also held in Edinburgh and Cardiff. South Africa beat defending champions England in the final 15–6 to win the World Cup.
 2007 Super 14 Final at ABSA Stadium, Durban – The Bulls score a converted try after the final horn to defeat the homestanding Sharks  20–19, becoming the first South African team to win the Super Rugby competition in its professional era.
 2007 Heineken Cup Final at Twickenham, London – London Wasps deny Leicester Tigers a treble with a 25–9 win.
Domestic competitions
 English Premiership – Leicester Tigers
 Top 14 – Stade Français
 Celtic League – Ospreys
 EDF Energy Cup – Leicester Tigers
 Air New Zealand Cup – Auckland
 Currie Cup – Free State Cheetahs
 Australian Rugby Championship – Central Coast Rays

Ski jumping
 Anders Jacobsen (Norway) wins the Four Hills Tournament

Snooker
 2007 World Snooker Championship – John Higgins wins his second world title after beating Mark Selby in the final 18–13.

Speed skating

Swimming
 2007 World Aquatics Championships held in Melbourne
 July – Swimming at the 2007 Pan American Games
 December – European Short Course Swimming Championships 2007 held in Debrecen, Hungary

Taekwondo
 World Championships held in Beijing

Tennis
 Australian Open Women's Singles – Serena Williams defeats Maria Sharapova 6–1, 6–2 in the final
 U.S. Open Men's Singles – Roger Federer defeats Novak Djokovic
 U.S. Open Women's Singles – Justine Henin defeats Svetlana Kuznetsova

Volleyball
 Men's World League: Brazil
 2007 Men's European Volleyball League: Spain
 Women's World Grand Prix: Netherlands

Water polo
 Men's water polo World Championship 2007 : Croatia
 Women's water polo World Championship 2007 : United States
 2007 FINA Men's Water Polo World League: Serbia
 2007 FINA Women's Water Polo World League: USA

Weightlifting
 European Championships held in Strasbourg
 World Championships held in Chiang Mai, Thailand

Multi-sport events
 2007 Winter Universiade, also known as the World Student Games, held in Turin, Italy
 2007 All-Africa Games held in Algiers, Algeria
 XV Pan American Games held in Rio de Janeiro, Brazil
 2007 Summer Universiade held in Bangkok, Thailand
 2007 Southeast Asian Games held in Nakhon Ratchasima, Thailand

References

 
Sports by year